Min Kyu-dong (born September 12, 1970) is a South Korean film director, screenwriter and producer. He made his feature directorial debut in horror film Memento Mori (1999), followed by romantic comedies All for Love (2005) and All About My Wife (2012), queer films Antique (2008) and In My End Is My Beginning (2013), melodrama The Last Blossom (2011), and period drama The Treacherous (2015).

Career
Min Kyu-dong studied economics at Seoul National University, and upon graduation, he entered the Korean Academy of Film Arts (KAFA). In 1999 Min made his first feature Memento Mori, alongside KAFA classmate and co-director Kim Tae-yong. Considered the most influential Korean horror film of the 2000s, Memento Mori has attained a modern-day classic status among Korean cinephiles.

After pursuing further film studies in France, Min returned in 2005 with his sophomore effort and solo directorial debut All for Love. Similar to Robert Altman's Short Cuts and Richard Curtis's Love Actually, Min utilized a large ensemble cast to weave a multitude of stories into a single narrative. About a diverse group of couples and singles who experience love or tragedy in the span of one week in Seoul (the Korean title translates to "The Most Beautiful Week of My Life"), the film was a box office success. 
 
In 2008, Min explored homosexual eroticism in Antique, a screen adaptation of the popular Japanese manga Antique Bakery by Fumi Yoshinaga. The film, about four pretty boys with hidden pasts working in a French pastry shop, was invited to the Berlin International Film Festival.

For his segment in the 2009 omnibus film Five Senses of Eros, Min continued his fascination with queer cinema. Using illusive and phantasmal cinematography, he brought a more experimental and dramatically edgy take on two women involved in a mild S&M relationship after the death of the man they both loved. A feature-length director's cut of In My End Is My Beginning was later screened at the 2009 Busan International Film Festival, then released in theaters in 2013.

Based on the semi-autobiographical TV series by writer Noh Hee-kyung (previously adapted into a novel and a stage play, the Korean title translates to "The Most Beautiful Goodbye/Farewell in the World"), Min confessed that he "cried a lot while writing the screenplay" of The Last Blossom. A moving story of a devoted mother diagnosed with a terminal illness whose family comes together for the first time to give her the support they've always denied her, the film received rave reviews from moviegoers and critics for its delicate depiction of family love.

In 2012, Min wrote and directed a remake of the Argentinean film Un novio para mi mujer ("A Boyfriend for My Wife"), which centers on a timid husband who hires a professional Casanova to seduce his seemingly perfect but fearsome wife. The romantic comedy All About My Wife became Min's biggest commercial hit yet.

Inspired by the Arabian Nights, Min directed the wrap-around sequences that "introduce" each segment by bridging the four short films of omnibus Horror Stories with a tale about a kidnapper who can go to sleep only when he listens to scary stories from his young female victim. Horror Stories was the opening film of the 2012 Puchon International Fantastic Film Festival. For the sequel Horror Stories 2, Min again directed the wrap-around sequences, this time structured around three mysterious insurance claim cases.

In 2015, Min directed the period drama The Treacherous (2015), set during the reign of Joseon king Yeonsan, considered the cruelest tyrant in Korean history. Min said he had always been interested in historical events, and that he wanted to talk about current social issues through them; he also said he wanted to feature Yeonsan from a new perspective by focusing on the relationship between the king and "treacherous subjects who wear the mask of faithfulness."

In 2020, he created the anthology science fiction project SF8.

Personal life
Min is married to Hong Ji-young, director of The Naked Kitchen.

Filmography
SF8 (2020) - creator, director, screenplay ("The Prayer" episode)
Herstory (2018) - director, screenplay
Horror Stories 3 "A Girl from Mars" (short film, 2016) - director, screenplay
The Treacherous (2015) - director
Horror Stories 2 "444" (short film, 2013) - director, screenplay
In My End Is My Beginning (2013) - director, screenplay
Horror Stories "Beginning" (short film, 2012) - director, screenplay
All About My Wife (2012) - director, screenplay
Sympathy for Us (2012) - crew member
Choked (2011) - crew member
The Last Blossom aka The Most Beautiful Goodbye (2011) - director, screenplay
Finding Mr. Destiny (2010) - producer
Five Senses of Eros "In My End Is My Beginning" (short film, 2009) - director, screenplay
The Naked Kitchen (2009) - producer
Antique (2008) - director, screenplay
The Wonder Years aka Girl, Thirteen (2007) - planner
All for Love aka My Lovely Week (2005) - director, screenplay
 Twentidentity "Secrets and Lies" (short film, 2004) - director
Memento Mori (1999) - director, screenplay
Pale Blue Dot (short film, 1998) - director, screenplay, editor, music
Wannabe (short film, 1998) - assistant director
Free to Fly (short film, 1997) - director, screenplay
Seventeen (short film, 1997) - director
HerStory (short film, 1996) - director, screenplay, editor, actor
Family Picture (1996) - production sound mixer

References

External links
  
 
 
 
 Min Kyu-dong at Korean Film Biz Zone

1970 births
Living people
20th-century South Korean writers
21st-century South Korean writers
People from Incheon
Seoul National University alumni
South Korean film directors
South Korean film producers
South Korean screenwriters
Yeoheung Min clan